The Atlantic Coast Conference men's basketball Coach of the Year is a basketball award given to head coaches in the Atlantic Coast Conference (ACC). The award is granted to the head coach voted to be the most successful that season by members of the Atlantic Coast Sports Media Association, and since the 2012–13 season has also been awarded in separate voting by the league's coaches. The award was first given following the 1953–54 season, the first year of the conference's existence, to Everett Case of NC State. The first winner of the coaches' award was Jim Larrañaga of Miami (FL) in 2013.

Dean Smith of North Carolina has won the most awards with eight, followed by Mike Krzyzewski of Duke, with five, and currently active coach Tony Bennett of Virginia, with four. Fourteen coaches in total have won the award more than once. Fourteen coaches have also won the award in the same season that they have also won a National Coach of the Year award; of those, only Krzyzewski and Smith have achieved the feat three times. Five coaches have won during the same season that they have coached a team that won the NCAA Tournament Championship: Tony Bennett, Frank McGuire, Norm Sloan, Dean Smith, and Gary Williams. McGuire is the only head coach to win the award at two different schools (North Carolina and South Carolina).

Each of the original (1953) ACC members have had at least one of their coaches win the award. Among schools that joined the ACC before 2013, Boston College is the only one that has never had a winning coach. Thirty-one different coaches from twelve schools have received the award. North Carolina has the most ACC Coach of the Year awards with twelve, while its in-state rival, Duke, is second with ten. Each school of Tobacco Road (including NC State and Wake Forest) has won at least seven awards, as has Virginia with eight.

Key

Winners

Winners by school

See also
Atlantic Coast Conference Men's Basketball Player of the Year
List of coaches in the Naismith Memorial Basketball Hall of Fame

Footnotes
The annotation "Miami (FL)" is used to signify that the school is the University of Miami, which is located in Coral Gables, Florida. There is another similarly–named school in the United States called Miami University, which is located in Oxford, Ohio. When these schools' athletic programs are referenced, they are usually demarcated with either "(FL)" or "(OH)" for disambiguation purposes.
The 1972–73 NC State Wolfpack team was forced to skip postseason play due to an NCAA recruiting infraction. Assistant coach Eddie Biedenbach had played in a pick-up (impromptu) basketball game with David Thompson on a recruiting visit to Raleigh, North Carolina. The Wolfpack finished the season undefeated at 27–0 but were never given the opportunity to compete for the national championship.
The University of Maryland, College Park left the ACC for the Big Ten Conference in 2014.
The University of South Carolina left the Atlantic Coast Conference in 1971, and is now a member of the Southeastern Conference.

References
General

Specific

NCAA Division I men's basketball conference coaches of the year
Coach
Awards established in 1954